Mark Albon (born 9 November 1969 in Billericay, Essex) is a retired British race car driver. He contested one round of the 1993 International Formula 3000 season for East Essex Racing at Donington Park, qualifying 21st on the grid and retiring from the race.

Before his F3000 race, he competed in the Formula Vauxhall Lotus Championship in 1991 and the British Formula Two Championship in 1992.

Since he retired from racing, he became the director of manufacturing and engineering at Albon Engineering, which provides automotive components to equipment manufacturers worldwide. He is the younger brother of Nigel Albon   and uncle to Nigel's son Alex

Racing record

Complete International Formula 3000 results 
(key) (Races in bold indicate pole position) (Races in italics indicate fastest lap)

References 

1969 births
International Formula 3000 drivers
Living people
English racing drivers
People from Billericay